The first banknotes of the third Czechoslovak koruna were issued by the Communist Party of Czechoslovakia in denominations of 1, 3 and 5 korun (state notes) and by the State Bank in denominations of 10, 25, 50 and 100 korun (banknotes). From 1958, new 25, 10, 100 and finally 50 Kčs banknotes were designed, and the state notes were gradually replaced by coins during the 1960s. The 20 Kčs banknote was printed from 1970 to replace the 25 Kčs note. The 500 Kčs banknote appeared in 1973. Starting with the 1000 Kčs banknote in 1985, a new, more uniform series (designer: Albín Brunovský) was issued adding a new denomination each year. This process was interrupted by the fall of the communism (and finally by the dissolution of the country) : the new 100 Kčs note issued in 1989 depicted Klement Gottwald, a prominent communist and was quickly withdrawn after the Velvet Revolution. A new 500 Kčs banknote was never issued.

See also

 Banknotes of the Czechoslovak koruna (1919)
 Banknotes of the Czechoslovak koruna (1945)

Czechoslovakia